Bulgarian actress Maria Bakalova has received various awards and nominations for her acting performances. She has won one Critics' Choice Movie Award, and her major nominations include an Academy Award, a Golden Globe Award, a BAFTA Award and a Screen Actors Guild Award. Her other accolades include numerous critics association and film festival awards.

Bakalova's breakthrough role as Tutar Sagdiyev in the 2020 mockumentary Borat Subsequent Moviefilm earned her an Academy Award nomination for Best Supporting Actress, making her the first Bulgarian actress to be nominated for an Oscar. She was also the first Bulgarian, and the first actress from Eastern Europe since Ida Kaminska in 1967, to be nominated at the Golden Globe Awards, receiving a nomination for Best Actress in a Motion Picture Comedy or Musical.


Awards and nominations

Other honors

Listicles

State honors

See also
 List of Bulgarian Academy Award winners and nominees
 List of European Academy Award winners and nominees

Notes

References

External links
 

Bakalova, Maria